Heidoti is a village in Boven Saramacca municipality (resort) in Sipaliwini District in Suriname. Heidoti is home to Maroons of the Kwinti tribe.

Heidoti had been built as a camp by the Geological and Mining Services, and was later settled by Nicodemus, who moved his family into the hamlet. In 1915, Nicodemus was appointed village chief. Since 2009, Heidoti is home to the Heidoti Tropical Park.

Heidoti can be reached by boat from Nieuw Jacobkondre, which has road access to the rest of the country, or from the Cabana Airstrip. In November 2019, IAMGOLD finished a road to the Saramacca Development Project in Cabana giving Heidoti direct access to the rest of the country.

References

Bibliography
 
 

Kwinti settlements
Populated places in Sipaliwini District
Gold mines in Suriname